Big Love is the eleventh studio album by British pop group Simply Red. The album was released on 29 May 2015 by East West Records. It is their first studio album since Stay (2007), and the first album to only feature original material since Life (1995). Big Love is also the first album to be released under a new recording contract with East West Records, a label Simply Red previously were signed to until April 2000.

Background 
On 3 November 2014, Simply Red announced they would be reforming in Autumn 2015 for a 30th anniversary European tour, the "Big Love Tour 2015".

On 19 April 2015, on their official Facebook page, the band announced that they would be releasing a new studio album containing 12 new tracks.

Lead singer Mick Hucknall said of the album: "Once I began wondering how Simply Red were going to sound, I started writing songs. With ‘Stay' I was running away from Simply Red. But now I'm comfortable with the notion of us as a blue-eyed soul group. I had to stop myself fighting that idea. Our sound is original too. I honestly don't know of another band that has pulled so many musical strands together". Hucknall has said he wanted to make an album like Stars with a consistent theme: "And the theme here is life from a family viewpoint. It’s an album that deals with birth, love, death, and all the stuff in between".

Chart performance 
The album debuted at number four on the UK Albums Chart, with first-week sales of 18,292 copies, becoming Simply Red's 13th top 10 album. In December 2015, the album was certified silver by the British Phonographic Industry (BPI) for shipments of 60,000 copies in the UK.

Critical reception 

At Metacritic, which assigns a "weighted average" rating out of 100 from selected independent ratings and reviews from mainstream critics, the album received a Metascore of 58, based on 7 reviews, indicating "mixed or average reviews". Harriet Gibsone of The Guardian gave Big Love three out of five stars and wrote that, "a wizened nostalgia hangs above this blue-eyed soul – the songs are smooth and sentimental, like easy-listening epitaphs. Wistful laments are nothing new for the group, and their unbridled sincerity remains consistent." The Telegraphs Helen Brown also gave the album three out of five stars, and commented that "Hucknall appears to have got some of his mojo back, with added sincerity."

Track listing 

The album was re-released on 27 November 2015 in a two-disc version entitled Big Love – Greatest Hits Edition (30th Anniversary), featuring a second CD with 18 previously released tracks.

Personnel 
 Mick Hucknall – vocals, guitars, all backing vocals (2-7, 10, 11, 12)
 Dave Clayton – keyboards 
 Kenji Suzuki – guitars
 Jack Stevens – bass (3, 4, 6, 7, 9, 10, 11)
 Roman Roth – drums (1-4, 6-11)
 Ian Kirkham – saxophone (1, 2, 10, 11)
 Kevin Robinson – flugelhorn (3, 6), trumpet (10, 11)

with:
 Danny Saxon – additional keyboards (1, 2)
 Juan Ayala Valdez – additional keyboards (7), additional guitars (7)
 Gavin Goldberg – programming
 Andy Wright – programming, backing vocals (1), bass (8)
 Mark Jaimes – additional guitars (1, 2), bass (1, 2)
 Steve Lewinson – bass (5, 12)
 Pete Lewinson – drums (5, 12)
 Peter-John Vettese – string arrangements (2, 3, 4, 6, 7, 9), backing vocals (9)
 Jim McWilliam – orchestrations and conducting (3, 4, 6, 7, 9)
 Isobel Griffiths – orchestra fixing (3, 4, 6, 7, 9)
 Everton Nelson – orchestra leader (3, 4, 6, 7, 9)
 David Whitaker – string arrangements (12)
 Sam Swallow – backing vocals (1)
 Purdy – vocal feature (7)
 Lauren Flynn – backing vocals (8)

Production 
 Andy Wright – producer 
 Mick Hucknall – producer, mixing 
 Lewis Chapman – recording
 Gavin Goldberg – recording
 Adrian Hall – recording, mix engineer
 Lorenzo Agius – photography 
 Dean Chalkey – band photography

Charts

Weekly charts

Year-end charts

Certifications

References

2015 albums
Simply Red albums
East West Records albums